Hristo Staev (born 4 October 1976) is a former Bulgarian footballer who played as a midfielder.

External links
 

1976 births
Living people
Bulgarian footballers
First Professional Football League (Bulgaria) players
Second Professional Football League (Bulgaria) players
Association football midfielders
Botev Plovdiv players
PFC Spartak Varna players
PFC Rodopa Smolyan players
FC Spartak Plovdiv players